Maria Creveling (February 2, 1995 – December 27, 2019), better known as Remilia, was an American professional League of Legends player. She was the first woman and transgender person to compete in the NA LCS, debuting in the 2016 Spring Split as the support for Renegades. However, she took a sudden hiatus from professional play a few weeks into her debut season due to on-stage pressure and online harassment. During her career she was particularly known for her mastery of the champion Thresh, which earned her the nicknames "Madwife" and "Thresh Queen".

Early life 
Creveling was born and raised in Portland, Maine. Prior to League of Legends, she was an avid player of Age of Mythology and GunZ: The Duel.

Career 
Before debuting in the NA LCS, Creveling played for several semi-professional League of Legends teams in the North American Challenger Series (NA CS), the NA LCS' secondary league. She joined her first team, Curse Academy, on July 22, 2013. Adopting the in-game name "Yuno", Creveling briefly played for the team as their support player in national ESL tournaments. She was noted for her prowess on the champion Thresh, which led to her being nicknamed "Madwife" and "Thresh Queen", the former a reference to Hong "MadLife" Min-gi, another well-known Thresh player. After leaving Curse Academy on August 12, 2013, Creveling played for a number of other teams attempting to qualify for the NA CS. On March 9, 2015, she joined Misfits NA's inaugural roster and changed her in-game name to "Remilia", a reference to the Touhou Project character Remilia Scarlet. Creveling finally qualified for the NA CS on June 16, 2015, after she and her teammates defeated Magnetic at the 2015 NA CS Summer Qualifier. Misfits NA rebranded to Renegades shortly afterwards, and the team went on to defeat Team Coast in the 2015 NA CS Summer Finals, qualifying for the 2016 NA LCS Spring Split.

On January 16, 2016, Creveling debuted as the NA LCS' first woman player, as well as its first transgender player. She also changed her in-game name once again, adopting the shortened alias of "Remi". After playing a third of the season's games, Creveling abruptly stepped down from the starting roster, citing on-stage pressure and online harassment. Two years later, she clarified her reasons for leaving in a series of tweets, revealing that a botched sex reassignment surgery had left her with severe and permanent nerve damage to her pelvic area, which caused her to suffer excruciating pain while playing onstage.

After an eight-month hiatus from professional play, Creveling joined Latin American team Kaos Latin Gamers under the in-game name "Sakuya", and played for the team from October 2016 to January 2017. She shifted her focus to streaming following her departure from Kaos Latin Gamers, although she played for a few semi-professional teams in the United States before her sudden passing in late 2019.

Death 
Creveling died in her sleep on December 27, 2019, at the age of 24. Her death was publicly announced a day later by esports journalist Richard Lewis, a close friend of Creveling's. Hundreds paid tribute to her online by leaving supportive comments on her Twitch and Twitter pages, praising her achievements and legacy as the first woman and transgender person to compete in the NA LCS. Riot Games, the developer of League of Legends, also released a statement mourning her death.

Notes

References

Further reading 
 

1995 births
2019 deaths
League of Legends support players
Renegades (esports) players
Team Dragon Knights players
American esports players
Women esports players
Transgender sportspeople
Transgender women
LGBT people from Maine
LGBT esports players
American LGBT sportspeople
Sportspeople from Portland, Maine